Ferreries is a municipality on the island of Menorca, in the Spanish autonomous community of the Balearic Islands. Its name is derived from the Catalan word ferrer ("blacksmith"), which in turn, comes from Latin word ferrum. At an elevation of 150 metres it is the island's highest town. Plaça Espanya

See also 
 Castle of Santa Àgueda

References

External links 
Official website 
Virtual map of Ferreries 
Information from Balearic Institute of Statistics (PDF format) 

Municipalities in Menorca
Populated places in Menorca